Kouango is a town located in the Central African Republic prefecture of Ouaka.

History 
In February 2013 Kouango was captured by Séléka rebels. It was recaptured by government forces on 8 March 2021.

Notable people
Antoine Darlan (1915-1974), politician

References 

Sub-prefectures of the Central African Republic
Central African Republic–Democratic Republic of the Congo border crossings
Populated places in Ouaka